"Sowing Season", titled "Sowing Season (Yeah)" in certain copies, is a song by American rock band Brand New, which was released as the lead single for their 2006 album, The Devil and God Are Raging Inside Me.

Two different versions of the track have been released. The demo titled "Yeah (Sowing Season)" first leaked in January 2006, and was not officially made available until 2015 when it was included as part of the Leaked Demos 2006, whilst the reworked demo became the opening track "Sowing Season" on the band's 2006 album The Devil and God Are Raging Inside Me.

Background 

An early incarnation of the track, known as "Yeah" was first described on the band's website in 2005, revealing that they had recorded it over the winter of 2004 and that "the refrain goes, "...YEAH!" and the middle eight is more like the chorus and it's got some loud guitars going on". In January 2006, a demo of the song was amongst nine tracks that leaked onto the internet, and was subsequently known as "Untitled #8".

After announcing the track listing of their third album The Devil and God Are Raging Inside Me on October 3, 2006, the CD single of "Sowing Season" was offered to customers who preordered the album through their online merchandise store. On October 20, 2006, "Sowing Season" premiered on the band's Myspace profile.

Composition 
The original lyrics for "Yeah (Sowing Season)" have been described by Lacey as being about "losing it all and figuring out how to get it all back". Elaborating on the track, Lacey revealed the track was written about members of his family going off to fight in World War II, specifically his Great Uncle, Leo Lacey. Jesse Lacey revealed that his Great Uncle Leo was an American soldier on a transport ship that was heading for Japan during the Pacific War. After the Atomic bombings of Hiroshima and Nagasaki, the transport he was on returned to America, which led Jesse Lacey to consider the duality of both something great happening in his Great Uncle not being deployed whilst "something completely awful [was] happening".

The album version of the song adapts parts from the Rudyard Kipling poem, "If—", which Lacey's father had hanging on the wall of his house.

In popular culture 

The track is playable on the 2009 video game Guitar Hero 5.

Track listing

Personnel
Credits adapted from liner notes.
 Brand New – production 
 Rich Costey – mixing 
 Emily Lazar – mastering 
 Jesse Lacey – production 
 Claudius Mittendorfer – engineer , recording 
 Sarah Register – mastering 
 Mike Sapone – production , mixing

References

Brand New (band) songs
2006 singles
Songs written by Jesse Lacey
2006 songs
Interscope Records singles
Songs written by Vincent Accardi